Prohegetotherium is an extinct genus of hegetotheriid notoungulates from the Late Oligocene to Early Miocene (Deseadan-Santacrucian in the SALMA classification) of the Agua de la Piedra, Mariño & Sarmiento Formations of Argentina, the Petaca and Salla Formations of Bolivia, and Fray Bentos Formation of Uruguay.

Taxonomy 
Prohegetotherium comprises three species, P. sculptum, P. schiaffinoi, and P. malalhuense. Although Prohegetotherium shumwayi and P. crassus have long been synonymized with P. sculptum, Kramarz and Bond (2017) restricted P. sculptum to the holotype, rejecting the synonymy.

References 

Typotheres
Miocene mammals of South America
Oligocene mammals of South America
Santacrucian
Colhuehuapian
Deseadan
Neogene Argentina
Paleogene Argentina
Fossils of Argentina
Paleogene Bolivia
Fossils of Bolivia
Paleogene Uruguay
Fossils of Uruguay
Fossil taxa described in 1897
Taxa named by Florentino Ameghino
Prehistoric placental genera
Golfo San Jorge Basin
Sarmiento Formation